Ajith Kosala Kuruppuarachchi (born 1 November 1964, Colombo) is a Sri Lankan Australian former cricketer who played in two Tests from 1986 to 1987.

On his debut on 14 March 1986, he took five wickets in the first innings against Pakistan in Colombo, including a wicket with his third delivery. With that, Sri Lanka beat Pakistan in a Test for the first time, where Kuruppuarachchi took a major part in both bat and ball.

International record

Test 5 Wicket hauls

References

Sources
 Hook, R. (1987) "Sri Lanka Profiles", Australian Cricket 1987-88 Guide, ed. Mengel, N.

1964 births
Living people
Sri Lanka Test cricketers
Sri Lankan cricketers
Nondescripts Cricket Club cricketers
Cricketers who have taken five wickets on Test debut
Sri Lankan emigrants to Australia